Dinajpur Government College is a government college located in Dinajpur.

History

Dinajpur Government College, located in Dinajpur, is one of Bangladesh's earliest higher educational institutions. It was established in 1942.

The college was temporarily closed and its dormitories vacated in October 2012 as a result of violent clashes between activists of two student political organizations, the Bangladesh Chhatra League and Islami Chhatra Shibir.

It offers four years Honors and one year Master's program in various majors; also offers HSC level. The college is affiliated with the Bangladesh National University. Several thousand students study here, it has a number of student halls and many students participate in central and national politics.

Academic departments
 Department of Accounting
 Department of Bengali
 Department of Botany
 Department of Chemistry
 Department of English
 Department of Economics
 Department of History
 Department of Islamic History and Culture
 Department of Mathematics
 Department of Management
 Department of Political Science
 Department of Philosophy
 Department of Physics
 Department of Sociology
 Department of Zoology
 Department of Financing

Degrees
 B.A. (Bachelor of Arts)
 B.B.S.
 B.S.S.
 B.Sc.
 HSC -Science
 HSC-Business Studies
 HSC-Humanities

Library
The library of Dinajpur College was established in 1942 at the time of establishment of the college. There are 30,000  books in the library.
Every department has a library of their own. Various kinds of cultural and educational plans are also held in library.

References

External links
 Dinajpur Government College Website
 Dinajpur Government College

Dinajpur District, Bangladesh
Schools in Dinajpur District, Bangladesh
Colleges in Dinajpur District